Bike the Drive or Fifth Third Bike the Drive is a recreational, non-competitive bicycle ride held each year in Chicago. Lake Shore Drive is cleared of motor vehicle traffic and opened exclusively to bicyclists for several hours beginning at dawn. The event benefits bicycling advocacy work in the region by the Active Transportation Alliance, formerly known as the Chicagoland Bicycle Federation. Since 2004, Bike the Drive has usually been held on the Sunday of Memorial Day weekend, though it was cancelled in 2020, and in 2021 and 2022 was held in early September. In 2006, an estimated 20,000 riders participated in the event. The event is sponsored by Fifth Third Bank and branded as Fifth Third Bike the Drive; it was previously sponsored by MB Financial Bank from 2010 to 2018 and prior to 2010, was sponsored by Bank of America.

Route

The route extends nearly the entire length of the famous roadway, from 57th Street on the South Side to Bryn Mawr Avenue on the North Side. Rest areas with refreshments and repair services are located at the north and south ends of the route, as well as the starting point. In addition, volunteers riding with the participants and stationed along the route offer assistance to riders. A festival in Grant Park follows the event, and includes music, food, cycling-related activities, and vendors and exhibitors.

History
Bike the Drive was launched by the Chicagoland Bicycle Federation in 2002 to raise funds for programs to expand the Chicago area's bicycle transportation network, promote bicycling as a mode of transportation, improve bicycling conditions and traffic safety, and provide bicyclists with a variety of resources and support.

The event is organized in coordination with the City of Chicago, its agencies and departments.

In 2020 the event was cancelled due to the COVID-19 pandemic in the United States. In 2021 and 2022, the ride was moved from the Sunday before Memorial Day to the Sunday before Labor Day.

Past event dates

 June 9, 2002
 June 15, 2003
 May 30, 2004
 May 29, 2005
 May 28, 2006
 May 27, 2007
 May 25, 2008
 May 24, 2009
 May 30, 2010
 May 29, 2011
 May 27, 2012
 May 26, 2013
 May 25, 2014
 May 24, 2015
 May 29, 2016
 May 28, 2017
 May 27, 2018
 May 26, 2019
 September 5, 2021
 September 4, 2022

See also

Cycling in Chicago
Boulevard Lakefront Tour

References

External links
Official Site
Active Transportation Alliance
Video of riding in Bike the Drive

Cycling in Chicago
Festivals in Chicago
Recurring events established in 2002
Cycling events in the United States
2002 establishments in Illinois
Open-streets events